The men's 20 kilometres walk competition at the 2018 Asian Games took place on 29 August 2018 at the Gelora Bung Karno Stadium.

Schedule
All times are Western Indonesia Time (UTC+07:00)

Records

Results 
Legend
DSQ — Disqualified

References

Men's 20 kilometres walk
2018 men 20km